Sultan Masud Mirza may refer to:
Sultan Mas'ud Mirza - Timurid Prince.
Massud Mirza